Llynoedd Ieuan is a Site of Special Scientific Interest in Ceredigion,  west Wales, Great Britain. The site is designated as a category IV by the International Union for Conservation of Nature on the IUCN Protected Area Management Categories scale.

See also
List of Sites of Special Scientific Interest in Ceredigion

References

Sites of Special Scientific Interest in Ceredigion